The nobility of Italy (Italian: Nobiltà italiana) comprised individuals and their families of the Italian Peninsula, and the islands linked with it, recognized by the sovereigns of the Italian city-states since the Middle Ages, and by the kings of Italy after the unification of the region into a single state, the Kingdom of Italy.

Nobles had a specific legal status, and held most of the wealth and various privileges denied to other classes, mainly politicians. In most of the former Italian pre-Unification states it was the only class that had access to high-level government positions. They also practically monopolized the most distinguished positions in the city-states and in the Catholic Church for a long time. There were several different systems of nobility over time and in different regions.

From the Middle Ages until March 1861, "Italy" was not a single country but was a number of separate kingdoms and other states, with many reigning dynasties. These were often related by marriage to each other and to other European royal families. The Italian nobility was expanded into Africa with the creation of the Italian Empire in conquered Eritrea and East Africa.

Recognition of Italian nobility ceased with the creation of the Italian Republic in 1946. Although many titles still exist, they are used as a matter of social courtesy and are not recognised under the law, except for a limited number of noble titles granted by the pope which are still formally acknowledged according to Article 42 of the Lateran Treaty.

History

Pre-unification
Before Italian Unification there was a relatively large number of members of the nobility in Italy.

In the 16th, 17th and 18th centuries, Italy (after the Renaissance) was home to a myriad of noble families that had risen to prominence via judicial appointment, election to the various regional senates or appointment to Catholic Church office.

There were also families which had been part of Italian nobility for many decades or even centuries. Writing in the 19th century, Leopold von Ranke recorded:

Sicilian nobility

Neapolitan nobility

Papal nobility

During this period, throughout Italy various influential families came to positions of power through the election of a family member as Pope or were elevated into the ranks of nobility through ecclesiastical promotion. These families freely intermarried with aristocratic nobility. Like other noble families, those with both papal power and money were able to purchase comunes or other tracts of land and elevate family patriarchs and other relatives to noble titles. Hereditary patriarchs were appointed Duke, Marquis and even Prince of various 16th and 17th century principalities. According to Ranke:

Popes commonly elevated members of prominent families to the position of Cardinal; especially second and third sons who would not otherwise inherit hereditary titles. Popes also elevated their own family members – especially nephews – to the special position of Cardinal-Nephew. Prominent families could purchase curial offices for their sons and regularly did, hoping that the son would rise through Church ranks to become a Bishop or a Cardinal, from which position they could dispense further titles and positions of authority to other family members.

The period was famous for papal nepotism and many families, such as the Barberini and Pamphili, benefited greatly from having a papal relative. Families that had previously been limited to agricultural or mercantile ventures found themselves, sometimes within only one or two generations, elevated to the Roman nobility when a relative was elected to the papal throne. Modern Italy is dotted with the fruits of their success – various family palazzi stand today as a testament to their sometimes meteoric rise to power.

Genoese nobility 
In the case of the Republic of Genoa, through the Constitutional Reform and the laws of 1528, 1548 and 1575, an aristocratic republic was inaugurated, which would last until 1797. With the constitutional reform of 1528, belonging to a albergo became from optional to compulsory, effectively transforming the alberghi into lists of registration to the city nobility recognized by the government. The reform required that the wealthiest citizens who owned six or more houses should originate a distinct albergo. On that occasion, it was decided to establish a single Order of noble citizens, otherwise known as Old Nobles, divided into twenty-three old and already existing alberghi and five new ones were created for the occasion. These associations were to prevent the resurgence of ancient hostilities and protect the wealth and power of the wealthiest families.

Florentine nobility 
The Florentine, and later Tuscan nobility distinguished itself in the two classes of Patricians, recognized as noble since before 1532, belonging to the Order of Saint Stephen, and residing only in the ancient noble homelands: Florence, Siena, Pisa, Pistoia, Arezzo, Volterra, Montepulciano and Cortona. And of the nobles, simple nobility, civic nobility, senators and commanders, with residence of the "new" noble homelands: Sansepolcro, San Miniato, Livorno, Pescia and Prato. Overall, the Florentine nobility was divided into feudal, senatorial and priority.

Milanese nobility 
In Milan, the first officially drawn up list of nobility was the "Matricula nobilium familiarum Mediolani" by Ottone Visconti, dated 20 April 1377, in which, however, only the noble Milanese families who helped the Visconti family in their seizure of power over the municipality of Milan were listed, therefore considered the most faithful and ancient nobility in the future lifetime of the city. From 5 September 1395 the Dukes of Milan officially obtained the right to grant nobility to as many nobles as there were, consistent with the recognition of the Duchy of Milan. During the whole ducal period, first of the Visconti and then of the Sforza, the nobility residing in the city was increasingly predisposed to become court nobility, in the direct service of the duke, especially in the field of arms and alliances for war purposes. These families, during this period, played a fundamental role in the politics of the territory, without ever completely outclassing the figure of the duke. Most of the Milanese patriciate is linked to this period, which in the following centuries will constitute a sign of distinction between the nobility granted "to the Milanese by their duke" and that granted by "foreigners".

Venetian nobility 

The Venetian Patriciate was one of the three social bodies into which the society of the Republic of Venice was divided, together with citizens and foreigners. Patrizio was the noble title of the members of the aristocracy ruling the city of Venice and the Republic. The title was abbreviated, in front of the name, by the initials N.H. (Nobil Homo), together with the feminine variant N.D. (Nobildonna). Holding the title of a Venetian patrician was a great honour and many European kings and princes, as well as foreign noble families, are known to have asked for and obtained the prestigious title.

The noble houses were primarily divided into Old (Case vecchie) and New houses (Case nuove), with the former being noted for traditionally electing the first Doge in 697 AD. The New houses were no less significant, as many became very prominent and important in influencing the history of the Republic of Venice. The families were furthermore divided into several other "categories", including Ducal houses (which gave Doges), Newest houses (Case nuovissime), Non-Venetian patricians, and "Houses made for money" (usually very wealthy landowning or bourgeoise families enriched through trade).

Although there were numerous noble houses across Venice's home and overseas land possessions, the Republic was in fact ruled as an oligarchy by about 20 to 30 families of Venice's urban nobility, who elected the Doge, held political and military offices and directly participated in the daily governing of the state. They were predominantly merchants, with their main source of income being trade with the East and other entrepreneurial activities, on which they became incredibly wealthy. Some of the most important families, who dominated the politics and the history of the state, include those such as the Contarini, Cornaro, Dandolo, Giustiniani, Loredan, Mocenigo, Morosini and the Venier families.

Kingdom of Italy (1861–1946)
In the years preceding the political and social movement that resulted in the consolidation of different states of the Italian Peninsula into a single state, the Kingdom of Italy, the existence of the Kingdom of Sardinia, the Kingdom of the Two Sicilies (before 1816: the Kingdom of Naples and the Kingdom of Sicily), the Grand Duchy of Tuscany, the Duchy of Parma, the Duchy of Modena, the Duchy of Savoy, the Papal States and the Austrian Kingdom of Lombardy–Venetia led to parallel nobilities with different traditions and rules.

Unification

Modern Italy became a nation-state during the Risorgimento on 17 March 1861, when most of the states of the peninsula and Kingdom of the Two Sicilies were united under King Victor Emmanuel II of the Savoy dynasty, hitherto monarch of the Kingdom of Sardinia, which included Piedmont. The architect of Italian unification was Count Camillo Benso di Cavour, the Chief Minister of Victor Emmanuel. Rome itself remained for a further decade under the Papacy, and became part of the Kingdom of Italy only in 1870. In September of that year, invading Italian troops entered the Papal state, and the ensuing occupation forced Pope Pius IX to his palace where he declared himself a prisoner in the Vatican, as did his successors, until the Lateran Pacts of 1929.

Nobility in the Kingdom
Under the united Kingdom of Italy a new national nobility, an attempt (not wholly successful) to impose a uniform nobiliary law, was created, including male succession (although it was possible for ancient titles to be transferred to an heir in the female line by royal authority), and some acknowledgement was made by the King of Italy of titles conferred by Francis II of the Two Sicilies in exile by making new grants in the same name. Those nobles who maintained allegiance to the pope became known as the Black Nobility.

After the unification of Italy, its kings continued to create titles of nobility for eminent Italians, this time valid for all Italian territory. For example, General Enrico Cialdini was created Duca di Gaeta for his role during unification. The practice continued until the 20th century, when nominations would be made by the Prime Minister of Italy and approved by the Crown. In the aftermath of the First World War, most Italians who were ennobled received their titles through the patronage of the Mussolini government. Examples include General Armando Diaz (Duca della Vittoria), Admiral Paolo Thaon di Revel (Duca del Mare), Commodore Luigi Rizzo (Conte di Grado e di Premuda), Costanzo Ciano (Conte di Cortellazzo i Buccari), Dino Grandi (Conte di Mordano) and Cesare Maria de Vecchi (Conte di Val Cismon). Many of these were victory titles for services rendered to the nation in the Great War. The writer and aviator Gabriele d'Annunzio was created Principe di Montenevoso in 1924, and the physicist, inventor, and Nobel laureate Guglielmo Marconi was also ennobled in 1924 as Marchese Marconi. In 1937, Ettore Tolomei was ennobled as Conte della Vetta. When Cardinal Eugenio Pacelli became Pope in 1939, Mussolini had the title of Principe posthumously bestowed on the new Pontiff's brother Francesco Pacelli, who had already been made a Marchese by the Holy See during his lifetime.

In 1929, the Lateran Treaty acknowledged all Papal titles created before that date and undertook to give unquestioned recognition to titles conferred by the Holy See on Italian citizens in the future.

After the successful Italian invasion of Abyssinia, the Mussolini government recommended some Italians to the king of Italy for titles of nobility. For example, Marshal Pietro Badoglio was created  Marchese del Sabotino and later Duke of Addis Abeba, while General Rodolfo Graziani became Marchese di Neghelli.

Italian Republic
In 1946, the Kingdom of Italy was replaced by a republic. Under the Italian Constitution adopted in 1948, titles of nobility, although still used as a courtesy, are not legally recognised.

Certain predicati (territorial designations) recognised before 1922 may continue to be attached to surnames and used in legal documents. Often these were historic feudal territories of noble families. Although a high court ruling in 1967 definitively established that the heraldic-nobiliary legislation of the Kingdom of Italy (1861–1946) is not current law, the title of the head of the noble family is still accorded to all descendants as courtesy titles.

Titles of nobility

The southern kingdoms of Naples, Sicily, and Sardinia, as well as the Papal states, granted titles as in monarchies such as Spain, France, or England: duke, marquis, count, baron. The title of viscount was not, however, as frequent in Italy as elsewhere. Joseph Bonaparte conferred the title "prince" to be hereditary on his children and grandchildren.

In Northern Italy and Tuscany the situation was complicated by the many kinds of authorities granting titles.

Often, Italian comunes (also in the Kingdom of Naples) and republics granted or recognised the title of patrician, which was only regarded as a rank of nobility in Italy. The patriciate was an urban aristocracy, as opposed to a feudal one.

The Republic of Venice also granted feudal titles.
In the Middle Ages: 

During the Renaissance, noble families conquered most of the Italian city-states except the republics of Venice, Genoa, Lucca, San Marino and Ragusa.

Until 1806, parts of the present-day Italy, formed the Kingdom of Italy, belonging to the Holy Roman Empire. The emperor retained for himself the right of creating dukes and princes. The Northern Italian monarchs had received from the emperor the right of granting the lesser feudal titles (from marquess downwards), since these monarchs often were princes and dukes themselves.

When in 1861 the king of Sardinia annexed the other Italian states, the Consulta Araldica (the Italian college of arms) integrated these different and varied systems into the hierarchy described below. In practice, this took decades.

Ranks
The official ranks under the Kingdom of Italy (1861–1946) were:

This hierarchy resulted from the overlapping of titles granted by the pre-unification states, though these were different from each other. As a consequence, titles were not evenly distributed throughout the country and in each region some titles may have been completely absent.

Post-World War II
By 1946, with abolition of the monarchy, a number of titles borne by families in the pre-unification states (Two Sicilies, Papal State, etc.) still had not been matriculated by the Consulta Araldica. This explains the use of certain titles by families (and "claimants") whose position was not regularised between 1861 and 1946.

Palaces and noble houses

Palaces of rulers

Palace of Caserta: residence of the king of the Two Sicilies.
Royal Palace (Naples): residence of the king of the Two Sicilies.
Royal Palace of Milan: residence of the duke of Milan.
Museo di Capodimonte: residence of the king of the Two Sicilies.
Palazzo dei Normanni: residence of the king of Sicily.
Residences of the Royal House of Savoy: residences of the king of Italy.
Ducal Palace of Colorno: residence of the duke of Parma and Piacenza.
Ducal Palace of Lucca: residence of the duke of Lucca.
Ducal Palace of Modena: residence of the duke of Modena and Reggio.
Ducal Palace of Massa (it): residence of the duke of Massa and Carrara.
Palazzo Ducale di Mantova: residence of the duke of Mantua.
Palazzo Ducale di Urbino: residence of the duke of Urbino.
Palazzo Pitti: residence of the grand duke of Tuscany.
Castle of Racconigi: residence of the Carignano line of the House of Savoy.
Royal Palace of Cagliari: official seat of the king of Sardinia in his kingdom, actually used as residence of the viceroy and some other administrative bodies.

Sovereign houses

House of Savoy: Kings of Italy (1861–1946), Kings of Sicily (1713–1720), kings of Sardinia (1720–1861), dukes of Savoy (1416–1861), lords and princes of Piedmont (1233–1416), counts of Savoy (1032–1416), marquises of Turin (1057–1233)
House of Ivrea Kings of Italy 
House of Habsburg and Habsburg-Lorraine: kings of Italy (1519–1802), kings of Sicily (1720–1734), kings of Sardinia (1708–1720), kings of Naples (1713–1734), kings of Lombardy–Venetia (1815–1859), grand dukes of Tuscany (1737–1801; 1815–1859), dukes of Milan (1535–1797), dukes of Parma and Piacenza; dukes of Mantua (1708–1797)
House of Hauteville: kings of Sicily (1130–1198), dukes of Apulia (1059–1198), counts of Apulia (1042–1059), counts of Sicily (1071–1130) 
House of Hohenstaufen: kings of Italy (1128–1135; 1154–1197; 1212–1250), kings of Sicily (1198–1266)
House of Anjou-Capetian: kings of Sicily (1266–1282), kings of Naples (1282–1442)
House of Barcelona: kings of Sicily (1282–1516), kings of Sardinia (1324–1516), kings of Naples (1442–1516)
House of Bourbon: dynasty divided into: 
House of Bourbon-Parma: dukes of Parma, Piacenza and Guastalla (1748–1802; 1847–1859), kings of Etruria (1801–1807), dukes of Lucca (1824–1847)
House of Bourbon-Two Sicilies: kings of Naples (1735–1806; 1815–1816), kings of Sicily (1735–1816), kings of the Two Sicilies (1816–1861)
House of Bonaparte: king of Italy (1805–1814), king of Rome, king of Naples (1806–1815)
House of Medici: de facto lords of Florence and Tuscany (1434–1494; 1512–1527), dukes of Florence (1531–1569), grand dukes of Tuscany (1569–1737)
House of Este: Margraves of Este (1171), lords and marquesses of Ferrara (1240–1471), dukes of Ferrara (1471–1597), dukes of Modena and Reggio (1452–1796), counts of Polesine and Garfagnana
House of Austria-Este: dukes of Modena and Reggio (1814–1860)
House of Farnese: dukes of Parma and Piacenza (1545–1731); dukes of Castro
House of Visconti: lords of Milan and Lombardy (1277–1395), dukes of Milan (1395–1447)
House of Sforza: dukes of Milan (1450–1499; 1512–1515; 1521–1535)
House of Gonzaga: lords of Mantua (1328–1433), marquesses of Mantua (1433–1530), dukes of Mantua (1530–1708); marquesses of Montferrat (1536–1574), dukes of Montferrat (1574–1708)
House of Paleologus: marquesses of Montferrat (1306–1536)
House of Aleramici: marquesses of Saluzzo (1125–1548), marquesses of Montferrat (before 933–1306)

Papal Houses

Duke

Marquesses

Gallery

See also
 Consulta araldica
 Corpo della Nobiltà Italiana
 Libro d'Oro
 Annuario della Nobiltà Italiana

References

External links
 Sicilian Nobility Listings
 Southern Italy Nobility Listings 
 Nobiliary and Aristocratic History
 European Royal Houses
 Castles in Italy: the medieval life of noble families (Clemente Manenti)
 Il Corpo della Nobiltà Italiana